The primacy of European Union law (sometimes referred to as supremacy or precedence of European law) is a legal principle establishing precedence of European Union law over conflicting national laws of EU member states.

The principle was derived from an interpretation of the European Court of Justice, which ruled that European law has priority over any contravening national law, including the constitution of a member state itself. For the European Court of Justice, national courts and public officials must disapply a national norm that they consider not to be compliant with the EU law.

The majority of national courts have generally recognized and accepted this principle, except for the part where European law outranks a member state's constitution. As a result, national constitutional courts have also reserved the right to review the conformity of EU law with national constitutional law.

Some countries provide that if national and EU law contradict, courts and public officials are required to suspend the application of the national law, bring the question to the national constitutional court and wait until its decision is made. If the norm has been declared to be constitutional, they are automatically obliged to apply the national law. This can create a contradiction between the national constitutional court and the European Court of Justice, like on 7 October 2021 when the Polish Constitutional Tribunal issued a judgment in case K 3/21 challenging the primacy of EU law in certain areas of the Polish legal order.

Development
In Costa v. ENEL. Mr Costa was an Italian citizen opposed to the nationalisation of energy companies. Because he had shares in a private corporation subsumed by the nationalised company, ENEL, he refused to pay his electricity bill in protest. In the subsequent suit brought to Italian courts by ENEL, he argued that nationalisation infringed EC law on the state distorting the market. The Italian government believed that not to be an issue that even could be complained about by a private individual since it was a decision to make by a national law. The ECJ ruled in favour of the government because the relevant treaty rule on an undistorted market was one on which the Commission alone could challenge the Italian government. As an individual, Mr Costa had no standing to challenge the decision, because that treaty provision had no direct effect. But on the logically prior issue of Mr Costa's ability to raise a point of EC law against a national government in legal proceeding before the courts in that member state the ECJ disagreed with the Italian government.  It ruled that EC law would not be effective if Mr Costa could not challenge national law on the basis of its alleged incompatibility with EC law.

It follows from all these observations that the law stemming from the treaty, an independent source of law, could not, because of its special and original nature, be overridden by domestic legal provisions, however framed, without being deprived of its character as community law and without the legal basis of the community itself being called into question.

In other cases, state legislatures write the precedence of EU law into their constitutions. For example, the Constitution of Ireland contains this clause: "No provision of this Constitution invalidates laws enacted, acts done or measures adopted by the State which are necessitated by the obligations of membership of the European Union or of the Communities".

C-106/77, Simmenthal [1978] ECR 629, duty to set aside provisions of national law that are incompatible with Union law.
C-106/89 Marleasing [1991] ECR I-7321, national law must be interpreted and applied, if possible, to avoid a conflict with a Community rule.

Article I-6 of the European Constitution stated: "The Constitution and law adopted by the institutions of the Union in exercising competences conferred on it shall have primacy over the law of the Member States". The proposed constitution was never ratified, after being rejected in referendums in France and the Netherlands in 2005. Its replacement, the Treaty of Lisbon, did not include the article on primacy but instead included the following declaration:

Particular countries
Depending on the constitutional tradition of member states, different solutions have been developed to adapt questions of incompatibility between State law and Union law to one another. EU law is accepted as having supremacy over the law of member states, but not all member states share the ECJ's analysis on why EU law takes precedence over state law if there is a conflict.

Belgium
In its ruling of 27 May 1971, often nicknamed the "Franco-Suisse Le Ski ruling" or "Cheese Spread ruling", the Belgian Court of Cassation ruled that self-executing treaties prevail over national law, and even over the Belgian Constitution.

In 2016, the Belgian Constitutional Court ruled that there is a limit to the primacy of EU law over the Belgian Constitution. Mimicking the Identitätsvorbehalt jurisprudence of the German Constitutional Court, it ruled that the core of Belgium's constitutional identity cannot be trumped by EU law.

Czech Republic
Article 10 of the Constitution of the Czech Republic states that every international treaty ratified by the Parliament of the Czech Republic is part of the Czech legislative order and takes precedence over all other laws.

France
Like many other countries within the civil law legal tradition, France's judicial system is divided between ordinary and administrative courts. The ordinary courts accepted the supremacy of EU law in 1975, but the administrative courts accepted the doctrine only in 1990. The supreme administrative court, the Conseil d'Etat, had held that as the administrative courts had no power of judicial review over legislation enacted by the French Parliament, they could not find that national legislation was incompatible with Union law or give it precedence over a conflicting State law. That was in contrast to the supreme ordinary court, the  Cour de cassation; in the case of Administration des Douanes v Société 'Cafes Jacques Vabre' et SARL Wiegel et Cie, it ruled that precedence should be given to Union law over State law in line with the requirements of the Article 55 of the French Constitution, which accorded supremacy to ratified international treaty over State law. The administrative courts finally changed their position in the case of Raoul Georges Nicolo by deciding to follow the reasoning used by the Cour de cassation.

Germany
In Solange II, the German Constitutional Court held that so long as  EU law had a level of protection of fundamental rights that is substantially in concurrence with the protections afforded by the German constitution, it would no longer review specific EU acts in light of that constitution.

Ireland
The Third Amendment of the Constitution of Ireland explicitly provided for the supremacy of EU law in Ireland by providing that no other provision of the Irish constitution could invalidate laws enacted if they were necessitated by membership of the European Communities. In Crotty v. An Taoiseach, the Irish Supreme Court held that the ratification of the Single European Act by Ireland was not necessitated by membership of the European Communities and so could be subject to review by the courts.

Italy
In Frontini v. Ministero delle Finanze, the plaintiff sought to have a national law disregarded without having to wait for the Italian Constitutional Court do so. The ECJ ruled that every State's supreme court must apply Union law in its entirety.

Lithuania
The Lithuanian Constitutional Court concluded on 14 March 2006 in case no. 17/02-24/02-06/03-22/04, § 9.4 in Chapter III, that EU law has supremacy over ordinary legal acts of the Lithuanian Parliament but not over the Lithuanian constitution. If the Constitutional Court finds EU law to be contrary to the constitution, the former law loses its direct effect and shall remain inapplicable.

Malta
Article 65 of the Maltese constitution provides that all laws made by Parliament must be consistent with EU law and Malta's obligations deriving from its Treaty of Accession.

Poland

While Poland rejects the idea of Primacy of European Union law as defined in case law on basis of the ruling K 18/04 of The Constitutional Tribunal it follows article 91. sec 3. of Constitution which gives international organization ability to formulate law that can overwrite Polish statutes. The law has priority in conflict with the statutes if the law is concurrent to the text of the treaty that constitutes that international organization. The ratified international agreement also overwrites the statutes if the statute is impossible to reconcile with the agreement on basis of article 91. sec 2.

The tribunal also have ruled that EU law can not override the Polish constitution. In a conflict between EU law and the constitution, constitution prevails. Poland can then make a sovereign decision as to how conflict EU law vs Constitution should be resolved (by changing the constitution, seeking to change the EU law or leaving the EU).

On 7 October 2021, Poland's Constitutional Tribunal ruled that some provisions of the EU treaties and some EU court rulings go against Poland's highest law.

Former members

United Kingdom
The United Kingdom was a member state of the European Union and its predecessor the European Communities from 1 January 1973 until 31 January 2020. During this time the issue of EU law taking precedence over national law was a significant issue and a cause for debate both among politicians and even in the judiciary.

In R v Secretary of State for Transport, ex p Factortame Ltd, the House of Lords ruled that courts in the United Kingdom had the power to "disapply" acts of parliament if they conflicted with EU law. Lord Bridge held that Parliament had voluntarily accepted this limitation of its sovereignty and was fully aware that even if the limitation of sovereignty was not inherent in the Treaty of Rome, it had been well established by jurisprudence before Parliament passed the European Communities Act 1972.

In 2011 the UK Government, as part of the Conservative–Liberal Democrat coalition agreement following the 2010 UK general election, passed the European Union Act 2011 in an attempt to address the issue by inserting a sovereignty clause. The clause was enacted in section 18 which says:

However, in the 2014 case of R (HS2 Action Alliance Ltd) v Secretary of State for Transport, the Supreme Court of the United Kingdom said:

At 23:00 GMT (00:00 CET in Brussels) on 31 January 2020, after 47 years of membership, the United Kingdom became the first member state to formally leave the European Union. It did so under the terms of the Brexit withdrawal agreement. At the same time, the European Communities Act 1972 (ECA 1972), the piece of legislation that incorporated EU law (Community law as it was in 1972) into the domestic law of the United Kingdom, was repealed by the European Union (Withdrawal) Act 2018, although the effect of the 1972 Act was saved by the provisions of the European Union (Withdrawal Agreement) Act 2020 to enable EU law to continue to have legal effect within the UK until the end of the implementation period, which ended on 31 December 2020. Since the implementation period has now ended, EU law no longer applies to the UK. However the principle of the supremacy of EU law applies to the interpretation of retained EU law. In September 2021 the UK government announced a review of retained EU law, aiming to remove the special status retained European Union law currently holds in the United Kingdom, and to repeal retained EU laws which are "no longer right for the UK".

See also

Thoburn v Sunderland City Council (2002)
Van Gend en Loos v Nederlandse Administratie der Belastingen (1963)
Supremacy Clause, analogous concept within the Constitution of the United States
Section 109 of the Constitution of Australia – analogous concept within the Constitution of Australia
Paramountcy (Canada) – analogous doctrine in Canadian constitutional law

Notes

European Union constitutional law